This List of leading goalscorers for the Algeria national football team contains football players who have played for the Algeria national team and is listed according to their number of goals scored. The Algeria national football team represents the nation of Algeria in international football. It is fielded by the Algerian Football Federation and competes as a member of Confederation of African Football.

Players
 Goals and appearances are composed of FIFA World Cup and Africa Cup of Nations matches and each competition's required qualification matches, as well as numerous international friendly tournaments and matches. Players marked in bold are still active and eligible (meaning they have not retired) to play for the national team.

Statistics correct as of game against Mali on 16 November 2022.

Position key:
GK – Goalkeeper;
DF – Defender;
MF – Midfielder;
FW – Forward

See also
 List of Algeria international footballers

References

External links
 web.archive.org